The Search for International Terrorist Entities (SITE) Institute  was an organization that tracked the online activity of terrorist organizations.  The SITE Institute was founded in 2002 by Rita Katz and Josh Devon, who had left the Investigative Project, a private Islamist-terrorist tracking group.  In early 2008 it ceased its operations, and some of its staff formed the SITE Intelligence Group, a for-profit entity, to continue some of its activities.

al-Qaeda tapes
 July 4, 2007:  A video by Ayman al-Zawahiri was obtained by SITE ahead of its release on the internet by militant web sites. The video had been provided by al-Qaeda's As-Sahab Media to IntelCenter.
 Sept. 7, 2007: SITE obtained a 30-minute video of Osama bin Laden and provided it to Associated Press. Bin Laden's image is "frozen" for all but 3½ minutes of the tape. SITE beat al-Qaeda by nearly a full day with the release of the video. The US government later pronounced the video authentic.
 May 3, 2011: The organization translated a lengthy statement signed by al-Qaeda's General Command that confirmed the death of Osama bin Laden and promised retaliation.

Controversies
"Federal agencies, including the National Security Agency, the F.B.I. and the Department of Homeland Security, monitor suspected terror sites on the Internet and sometimes track users. Private groups like Ms. Katz's Search for International Terrorist Entities Institute and The Middle East Media Research Institute are also keeping track of the ever-changing content of these sites. Ms. Katz's institute, which relies on government contracts and corporate clients, may be the most influential of those groups, and she is among the most controversial of the cyberspace monitors. While some experts praise her research as solid, some of her targets view her as a vigilante. Several Islamic groups and charities, for example, sued for defamation after she claimed they were terrorist fronts, even though they were not charged with a crime," the New York Times reported September 23, 2004.
On 30 May 2008, The Daily Telegraph published an online article reporting that SITE had wrongly identified footage from the post-apocalyptic computer game Fallout 3 as being created by terrorists considering a nuclear attack against the West. According to the article, SITE found the Fallout 3 images in a video called Nuclear Jihad: The Ultimate Terror, posted on two possibly al-Qaeda affiliated and password protected websites, where it also gleaned chat logs from users discussing nuclear attacks on the West. SITE released a statement to clarify its position, stating that it never claimed the images were produced by terrorists, although it didn't admit to knowing from the start that they were video game images. The Daily Telegraph subsequently removed the article from its website.

See also
 
 Internet Haganah
 The Jawa Report
 Jihad Watch
 NEFA Foundation

References

External links
 SITE Intelligence Group

Institutes based in the United States
Intelligence websites
Open-source intelligence